Varmazyar (also Romanized as Varmazyār) is a village in Yowla Galdi Rural District, in the Central District of Showt County, West Azerbaijan Province, Iran. At the 2006 census, its population was 73, in 20 families.

References 

Populated places in Showt County